The following is a list of cricket grounds, ordered by capacity, . Currently, all grounds with a capacity of 15,000 or more which are the home venue of a club or national team are included. Some grounds with a capacity of more than 10,000 are also included.

Active stadiums

Capacity of 100,000 to 50,000

Capacity of 50,000 to 40,000

Capacity of 40,000 to 30,000

Capacity of 30,000 to 20,000

Capacity of 20,000 to 15,000

Capacity of 15,000 to 10,000

Capacity of 10,000 to 5,000

Capacity of 5,000 and below

Stadiums under construction

Former or demolished stadiums

See also
 List of Test cricket grounds by date
 List of international cricket grounds in India
 List of cricket grounds in Australia
 List of cricket grounds in England and Wales

Notes

References

Cricket grounds by capacity
Cricket
Capacity